John Swire may refer to:

 John Swire (1793–1847), British trader and founder of the Swire Group 
 John Samuel Swire (1825—1898), founder of Taikoo Sugar Refinery in 1881
 John Kidston Swire (1893-1983), chairman of Swire Group from 1946 to 1966
 John Anthony Swire CBE (1927-2016), President, John Swire and Sons Ltd